Johanna  is an East German television series broadcast in 1989. It stars Ute Lubosch as the titular Berlin tram driver Johanna Rothermund.

See also
List of German television series

External links
 

1989 German television series debuts
1989 German television series endings
Television shows set in Berlin
Television in East Germany
German-language television shows
Das Erste original programming